The Tianzhou is a Chinese automated cargo spacecraft developed from China's first prototype space station Tiangong-1 to resupply its  modular space station. It was first launched (Tianzhou 1) on the Long March 7 rocket from Wenchang on April 20, 2017 and demonstrated autonomous propellant transfer (space refueling).

The first version of Tianzhou has a mass of 12,910 kg and can carry 6,500 kg of cargo.

Function
Based on the Tiangong-1 space station, the Tianzhou functions as the main automated cargo spacecraft for the Tiangong space station. It has pressurized, semi-pressurized and unpressurized cargo capabilities, and is able to transport airtight cargo, large extravehicular payloads and experiment platforms. It was first launched on the new Long March 7 rocket from Wenchang on April 20, 2017.

Name
The China Manned Space Engineering Office opened a consultation for the naming of the prospective cargo ship on April 25, 2011. By May 20, it had received more than 50,000 suggestions. On July 8, Yang Liwei, China's first astronaut and deputy director of the Chinese Academy of Sciences revealed that they had a short list of ten names. On October 31, 2013, it was revealed that the spacecraft had been named Tianzhou, combining the Chinese names of the Tiangong space stations and the Shenzhou spacecraft. They also stated that they would use the two letter identification TZ.

Missions

See also

 Comparison of space station cargo vehicles
 Progress spacecraft – an expendable cargo vehicle currently in use by the Russian Federal Space Agency
 Automated Transfer Vehicle – a retired expendable cargo vehicle used by the ESA
 Cygnus spacecraft – an expendable cargo vehicle developed by Northrop Grumman under American CRS program, currently in use.
 H-II Transfer Vehicle – an expendable cargo vehicle currently in use by JAXA
 Dream Chaser Cargo System - a cargo variant of the reusable SNC's spaceplane with Shooting Star module.
 Dragon cargo spacecraft - a reusable cargo vehicle developed by SpaceX, under American CRS program, currently in use.

References

External links 
 

 
Cargo spacecraft
Vehicles introduced in 2017
Space program of the People's Republic of China
2017 establishments in China